Quincey Clark (born June 5, 1972) is a former competitor in Greco-Roman Wrestling, who represented the United States at the 2000 Summer Olympics. Clark also represented the U.S. at the 1998 and 1999 FILA World Wrestling Championships and the 1999 Pan American Games, where he won the silver medal. His highest placing in world-level competition was 8th, at the world championships in 1999. Clark was also an All-American in Collegiate Wrestling for the University of Oklahoma in 1995. He finished in 2nd place, behind future Freestyle Wrestling world champion, Les Gutches.

References
sports-reference.com

External links
 

1972 births
Living people
Olympic wrestlers of the United States
Wrestlers at the 2000 Summer Olympics
American male sport wrestlers
Wrestlers at the 1999 Pan American Games
Pan American Games silver medalists for the United States
Pan American Games medalists in wrestling
Medalists at the 1999 Pan American Games